Tamara Anatoliyivna Yerofeyeva (born 4 March 1982) is a famous individual rhythmic gymnast. She was All-Around World Champion, multiple World Cup's winner, World Universiade winner and an Olympic Game's finalist. Tamara was competing for Ukraine's National Team from 1996 to 2004 winning more than 300 medals for Ukraine at various competitions. She currently lives in Las Vegas, USA and performing with her solo hoops act at different shows including Cirque Du Soleil, Spiegelworld, David Saxe Productions and more. Also, she’s participating in all kinds of gala and corporate events around the world. One of her recent performances was at Fashion Costume Showcase of famous french designer Thierry Mugler in Montreal, Canada.

Career
Tamara started rhythmic gymnastics at the age of 6 in Kiev, Ukraine. When she was 12 she got invited to the world famous Deriugina School where she’s pretty quickly became Deriugina’s number one gymnast and got her spot in the national team. In 2001, when Yerofeyeva was 19, she became a leader of the Ukrainian National Olympic Team. She was a four-time World champion, four-time World Cup winner, Seven-time silver medalist at the European Championships, four-time gold medalist at the 2001 World Universiade, and placed sixth in the all-around final at the 2000 Sydney Olympics.

Tamara retired from competition in 2004 right before Olympic Games in Athens. After her retirement she created a solo hoops act and performed with top entertainment companies including world famous Cirque Du Soleil. Currently, she lives in Las Vegas and performs at different shows including "Zumanity" by Cirque Du Soleil at New York, New York Resort and Casino, "V The Ultimate Variety Show" and musical "VEGAS!-The Show" at the Planet Hollywood Resort and Casino.

Personal life 
Yerofeyeva is married to Stoyan Metchkarov, with whom she has a son named Alexander.

Routine music information

Detailed Olympic results

References

External links

1982 births
Living people
Ukrainian rhythmic gymnasts
Deriugins Gymnasts
Gymnasts from Kyiv
Universiade medalists in gymnastics
Olympic gymnasts of Ukraine
Gymnasts at the 2000 Summer Olympics
Medalists at the Rhythmic Gymnastics World Championships
Medalists at the Rhythmic Gymnastics European Championships
Universiade gold medalists for Ukraine
Universiade silver medalists for Ukraine